Breviceps fuscus, also known as black rain frog, plain rain frog, brown short-headed frog, and Tsitsikama rainfrog, is a species of frogs in the family Brevicipitidae. It is endemic to the southern coast of South Africa.

Description 
Breviceps fuscus have a round body with short limbs and toes. Its feet are inward facing which allows the frog to burrow much more effectively . Skin has no warts, but pronounced widely spaced lumps or small tubercles and pitting are present. Colouration is typically dark brown or nearly black, with a slightly lighter ventrum and no pigmented patterns. They have a squat body and their legs are rather short, which gives the frog its distinctive appearance.

Distribution and habitat 
It is a burrowing species inhabiting fynbos and forest fringes and does not require the presence of open water. They prefer to dwell near dislodged sand piles due to their burrowing behaviour.

Behaviour 
Breviceps fuscus is a burrowing frog, and can be found in tunnels up to 150 mm deep or among vegetation up to about 30 cm above the ground, and it generally prefers to avoid water. The frog generally spends most of its time underground as it does not require open water and is primarily nocturnal. At night the black rain frog emerges from its burrow to scavenge for food and sometimes mate.

Reproduction 
Males call from within burrows (sometimes while guarding eggs) and from above-ground vegetation. The call is a short (0.2 s) "chirp", with a dominant frequency of 1.8 kHz. The eggs are laid within burrows with small (15 mm) openings and about 30–40 mm deep. Each nest consists of approximately 42–43 yellow eggs that are 5 mm in diameter inside 8 mm capsules.

Young 
Like frogs in the family Brevicipitidae in general, Breviceps fuscus show direct development (i.e., there is no free-living larval stage). This means that the breviceps fuscus does not have tadpoles and instead has young which emerge from the egg as smaller versions of the adults. These are called froglets.

Survival 
Breviceps fuscus has many survival mechanisms to combat predators as unlike other frogs they are not able to jump or swim to evade predators due to their unique body shape, including the ability to burrow up to 20 centimetres deep (8 inches). They have also been observed to puff up their body to make them up to 7 times larger as a defence mechanism. When in danger, they fill up with air to appear bigger in an attempt to ward off predators like bush pigs, birds, and snakes. They are also able to use this ability to jam themselves in their burrows preventing some snakes from pulling them out of the burrow  Their distress call is a short high pitched chirp. They also have small lumps all over their body. This is believed to be a mechanism to deter predators as to a predator these lumps appear poisonous although it is not believed that they are poisonous.

Conservation 
Breviceps fuscus is a locally abundant species but the exact population is not known. It does not tolerate habitat disturbance, so habitat loss caused by afforestation, the spread of alien vegetation, and too frequent fires are threats to it. However, overall, its habitat is well protected and it occurs in several protected areas.

Taxonomy 
The specific name fuscus refers to the dark colouration of this species as the animal is usually dark brown or black. The black rain frog was first described by John Hewitt, in 1925 after a specimen was collected in Knysna.

Feeding 
Like many other frogs the breviceps fucus is an Insectivore which feeds on small insects, spiders, insect larvae and worms.

Classification 
The Breviceps fuscus was originally classified as a member of the Microhylidae but polygenic research led to the family Brevicipitidae being classified as a family of its own and Breviceps fuscus was included in it along with the other frogs in its genus.

References

Further reading 

 Alan Changing (2001) Amphibians of South Africa 
 

fuscus
Frogs of Africa
Endemic amphibians of South Africa
Amphibians described in 1925
Taxa named by John Hewitt (herpetologist)
Taxonomy articles created by Polbot